This is a list of countries by their exchange rate regime.

Table of Monetary Policy framework

No legal tender of their own

US dollar as legal tender

Euro as legal tender

Australian dollar as legal tender

Swiss franc as legal tender

Currency board

US dollar as exchange rate anchor
 (XCD)
 (DJF)
 (XCD)
 (XCD)
 (HKD)
 (XCD)
 (XCD)
 (XCD)

Euro as exchange rate anchor
 (BAM)
 (BGN)
 (XPF)

Singapore dollar as exchange rate anchor
 (BND)

Hong Kong dollar as exchange rate anchor
 (MOP)

Conventional peg

US dollar as exchange rate anchor
 (AWG)
 (AZN)
 (BSD)
 (BHD)
 (BBD)
 (BZD)
 (BMD)
 (ANG)
 (ERN)
 (JOD)
 (OMR)
 (PAB)
 (QAR)
 (SAR)
 (ANG)
 (SSP)
 (TMT)
 (AED)

Euro as exchange rate anchor 
 (XOF)
 (XOF)
 (CVE)
 (XAF)
 (XAF)
 (XAF)
 (KMF)
 (XOF)
 (DKK)
 (XAF)
 (XAF)
 (XOF)
 (XOF)
 (XOF)
 (XAF)
 (STD)
 (XOF)
 (XOF)

Rand as exchange rate anchor 
 (SZL)
 (LSL)
 (NAD)

Composite exchange rate anchor
 (FJD)
 (KWD)
 (LYD)
 (MAD)
 (WST)

Indian Rupee as exchange rate anchor
 (BTN)
 (NPR)

Other
 (SBD)

Stabilized arrangement

US dollar as exchange rate anchor
 (GYD)
 (IQD)
 (KZT)
 (LBP)
 (MVR)
 (SRD)
 (TTD)

Euro as exchange rate anchor
 (MKD)

Composite exchange rate anchor
 (SGD)
 (VND)

Monetary aggregate target
 (BDT)
 (BIF)
 (CDF)
 (GNF)
 (LKR)
 (TJS)
 (YER)

Other
 (AOA)
 (AZN)
 (BOB)

Crawling peg

US dollar as exchange rate anchor
 (NIO)

Composite exchange rate anchor
 (BWP)

Crawl-like arrangement

US dollar as exchange rate anchor
 (HNL)
 (JMD)
 (PGK)

Monetary aggregate target
 (CNY)
 (ETB)
 (UZS)

Inflation-targeting framework
 (AMD)
 (DOP)
 (GTQ)

Other
 (BYR)
 (HTG)
 (LAK)
 (CHF)
 (TND)

Pegged exchange rate within horizontal bands

Composite exchange rate anchor
 (TOP)

Other managed arrangement

US dollar as exchange rate anchor
 (KHR)
 (LRD)

Composite exchange rate anchor
 (DZD)
 (IRR)
 (SYP)

Monetary aggregate target
 (GMD)
 (MMK)
 (NGN)
 (RWF)

Inflation-targeting framework
 (CZK)

Other
 (CRC)
 (KGS)
 (MYR)
 (MRO)
 (PKR)
 (SDG)
 (VUV)
 (VEF)

Floating

Monetary aggregate target
 (AFN)
 (ARS), until September 2019.
 (KES)
 (MGA)
 (MWK)
 (MZN)
 (SCR)
 (SLL)
 (TZS)
 (UAH)
 (UYU)

Inflation-targeting framework
 (ALL)
 (BRL)
 (COP)
 (GEL)
 (GHS)
 (HUF)
 (ISK)
 (IDR)
 (ILS)
 (KRW)
 (MDL)
 (NZD)
 (PYG)
 (PEN)
 (PHP)
 (RON)
 (RSD)
 (ZAR)
 (THB)
 (TRY)
 (UGX)

Other
 (PKR)
 (MUR)
 (MNT)
 (ZMW)

Free floating

Inflation-targeting framework
 (AUD)
 (CAD)
 (CLP)
 (JPY)
 (MXN)
 (NOK)
 (PLN)
 (SEK)
 (GBP)
 (INR)

Other
 (EUR)

 (EGP)
 (RUB)
 (SOS)
 (USD)

See also
Reserve currency
Managed float regime

References

Currency lists
Foreign exchange market